The 2011 Family Circle Cup was a women's tennis event on the 2011 WTA Tour. It took place from April 4 to April 10, 2011. It was the 39th edition of the tournament and one of the Premier level tournaments. The event was hosted at the Family Circle Tennis Center, on Daniel Island, Charleston, South Carolina, United States. It was the only event of the clay court season played on green clay. The total prize money offered at this tournament was 

The field was led by top seed and World No. 1 Caroline Wozniacki and defending champion Samantha Stosur. They were joined by former champions Jelena Janković, Nadia Petrova, and Sabine Lisicki.

Finals

Singles

 Caroline Wozniacki defeated  Elena Vesnina, 6–2, 6–3
It was Wozniacki's 3rd title of the year and 15th of her career. It was her 1st Premier-level title of the year and 4th of her career.

Doubles

 Sania Mirza /  Elena Vesnina defeated  Bethanie Mattek-Sands /  Meghann Shaughnessy, 6–4, 6–4

Prize money & points distribution

Points distribution

Prize money
The total commitment prize money for this year's event is $721,000.

Entrants

Seeds

Rankings are as of March 21, 2011.

Other entrants 
The following players received wildcards into the main draw:
  Jamie Hampton
  Sabine Lisicki
  Shelby Rogers

The following players received entry from the qualifying draw:

  Eva Birnerová
  Irina Falconi
  Sania Mirza
  Monica Puig
  Sloane Stephens
  Alexandra Stevenson
  Anna Tatishvili
  Heather Watson

Withdrawals
  Akgul Amanmuradova
  Viktoriya Kutuzova
  Serena Williams (foot injury & pulmonary embolism)

References

External links

 Official website

Family Circle Cup
Charleston Open
Family Circle
Family Circle
Family Circle